"Veni Veni" is a single released by electro-medieval/darkwave band Helium Vola. It was released February 9, 2004 by Chrom Records.

Track listing 
 "Veni Veni (Club Version)" – 6:13
 "Printemps" – 5:32
 "Mahnung" – 3:39
 "Veni Veni (Radio Edit)" – 8:37

2004 singles
2004 songs